Ontario Heritage Square, officially known as Heritage Square Museum, is a museum in Ontario, New York in Wayne County, New York.  It is located at the site of the Brick Church Corners, a historic district listed on the National Register of Historic Places in 1973.

The district includes the North Ontario Methodist Church, the Pease-Micha Homestead, the Schoolhouse District No. 4, the Ruffell Log Cabin, and the site of a 19th-century sawmill and house.

The museum includes several other buildings that have been moved to the site.

Gallery

References

External links
Heritage Square Museum, official site

Houses on the National Register of Historic Places in New York (state)
Historic districts on the National Register of Historic Places in New York (state)
Buildings and structures in Wayne County, New York
Museums in Wayne County, New York
Historic house museums in New York (state)
History museums in New York (state)
Churches on the National Register of Historic Places in New York (state)
Houses in Wayne County, New York
National Register of Historic Places in Wayne County, New York